Heino Freyberg (31 October 1922 – 26 January 1978) was a Swedish bobsledder. He competed in the two-man and the four-man events at the 1964 Winter Olympics.

References

1922 births
1978 deaths
Swedish male bobsledders
Olympic bobsledders of Sweden
Bobsledders at the 1964 Winter Olympics
Sportspeople from Tallinn